Sigismund of Bavaria (26 July 1439 – 1 February 1501) was a member of the Wittelsbach dynasty. He ruled as Duke of Bavaria-Munich from 1460 to 1467, and then as Duke of Bavaria-Dachau until his death.

Biography
Sigismund was the third son of Albert III of Bavaria with Princess Anna of Brunswick-Grubenhagen-Einbeck his second wife.

Sigismund was Duke of Bavaria-Munich from 1460 to 1467, until 1463 together with his brother John IV. In 1467, he resigned in favor of his younger brother Albert IV and then kept only the new duchy of Bavaria-Dachau as his domain until his death. 

In 1468, the foundation stone of the Frauenkirche in Munich was laid by Sigismund. He also ordered to enlarge Blutenburg Castle, to construct its chapel, and to build the church St. Wolfgang in Pipping nearby in 1488. The redesign of the ducal court Alter Hof was initiated by Sigismund as well who lived there for a time towards the end of the 15th Century and was generally a patron of the revival of Gothic arts in Bavaria. 

Sigismund died on February 1, 1501, at Blutenburg Castle and was buried at the Frauenkirche in Munich.

Ancestors

 
 

1439 births
1501 deaths
15th-century dukes of Bavaria
16th-century dukes of Bavaria
House of Wittelsbach
Burials at Munich Frauenkirche